Prescott Bush (1895–1972) was a U.S. Senator from Connecticut from 1952 to 1963. Senator Bush may also refer to:

Charles P. Bush (1809–1857), Michigan State Senate
E. Ogden Bush (1898–1987), New York State Senate
John T. Bush (1811–1888), New York State Senate
Melinda Bush (born 1956), Illinois State Senate
Nellie T. Bush (1888–1963), Arizona State Senate